Jack and the Beanstalk is a 2009 American fantasy adventure comedy film directed by Gary J. Tunnicliffe, from a story based on the classic fairy tale of the same name. The film stars an ensemble cast led by Colin Ford, Gilbert Gottfried, Christopher Lloyd, Chloë Grace Moretz, Wallace Shawn, Katey Sagal, James Karen, Daniel Roebuck, Madison Davenport, and James Earl Jones.

Plot
Jack Thatcher (Colin Ford) must perform a heroic deed or flunk out of fairy tale school. He sells a valuable possession for magic beans that grow into a giant beanstalk overnight. One bean also is eaten by the family goose Grayson, turning them into a mostly human-man (Gilbert Gottfried). They climb the enchanted beanstalk due to Jack wanting to prove himself a hero after the legacy of his father, with Grayson accompanying him to try and keep him safe. They enter a magical and dangerous world to rescue Destiny (Madison Davenport), a little girl who has been transformed into a harp by an evil giant.

This version of the tale includes references to other fairy tale characters as well as contemporary elements.

Cast

 Colin Ford as Jack
 Chloë Grace Moretz as Damsel in Distress / Jillian Squarejaw
 Christopher Lloyd as Headmaster
 Adair Tishler as Rapunzel
 Billy Unger as Prince Charming
 Emily Rose Everhard as Red Riding Hood
 Sadie Eve as Sleeping Beauty
 Victoria Atilano as Ugly Step Sister
 Atalaya Atilano as Mean Step Sister
 Anthony Skillman as Hansel
 Sammi Hanratty as Gretel
 Daniel Roebuck as Mayor Lichfield
 Wallace Shawn as Broker / Booker / Lancelot Squarejaw
 Katey Sagal as Jack's Mother
 Gilbert Gottfried as Grayson
 James Karen as Verri Saddius
 Madison Davenport as Destiny
 David Mattey as Giant
 James Earl Jones as Giant's Voice
 Jeff L. Deist as Dobbytok
 Gary J. Tunnicliffe as Dobbytok's Voice / Nervous Lumberjack
 Frank Payne as Sergeant Who
 Kevin Schon as Officer What
 Hal B. Klein as Officer Where
 Chevy Chase as General Antipode

Release
The film premiered at the Samuel Goldwyn Theater in Beverly Hills on November 6, 2009. It later screened at the Newport Beach Film Festival on April 24, 2010, before being released on DVD in the United States by Screen Media Films on May 11, 2010.

Reception

Critical response
Tracy Moore of Common Sense Media called the film "goofy fun" and gave it 3/5 stars.

In an otherwise positive review, MovieGuide wrote, "The sets and costumes are occasionally hokey. Also, the occasional toilet humor and slapstick comedy sometimes detracts from the movie’s natural charm." Nevertheless, MovieGuide gave the film 3/4 stars.

Sloan Freer of Radio Times called it a "charmless take on the classic fairy tale" and later lamented that "James Earl Jones wastes his rich tone as the voice of the underwhelming goliath."

Jason Best of What's on TV wrote that Jack and the Beanstalk "seeks to emulate the playful wit of the wondrous The Princess Bride but falls woefully short." He went on to note that "Christopher Lloyd, Wallace Shawn and Chevy Chase are also involved, so you’d expect the film to be a lot funnier than it is, but Gary J Tunnicliffe’s flat direction doesn’t give anyone a chance to shine."

Donna Rolfe of The Dove Foundation wrote, "This is a charming fairy tale with encouraging values and colorful characters who will entertain the entire family."

The Netflix company DVD.com called it a "family-friendly comedy" and gave it 31/3 out of 5 stars.

Accolades

References

External links
 

2009 films
2009 comedy films
2009 fantasy films
2009 independent films
2010 direct-to-video films
2000s adventure comedy films
2000s children's adventure films
2000s children's comedy films
2000s children's fantasy films
2000s fantasy adventure films
2000s fantasy comedy films
American adventure comedy films
American children's adventure films
American children's comedy films
American children's fantasy films
American direct-to-video films
American fantasy adventure films
American fantasy comedy films
American independent films
Direct-to-video adventure films
Direct-to-video comedy films
Direct-to-video fantasy films
Fairy tale parody films
Films based on Jack and the Beanstalk
Films directed by Gary J. Tunnicliffe
Films shot in Los Angeles
2000s English-language films
2000s American films